A flying car is a roadable aircraft, a vehicle which can travel both on roads and in the air.

Flying car may also refer to:

 The Flying Car (1920 film), a German silent film directed by Harry Piel
 The Flying Car (2002 film), a short film written and directed by Kevin Smith

See also
 Hovercar, a car or automobile similar to commercial and military hovercraft vehicles
 Fly-car, a rapid response medical assistance vehicle
 Aerocar (disambiguation)
 Skycar (disambiguation)